Moraid  is a District in the Tambrauw Regency of Southwest Papua, Indonesia. The town is located on the northern coast of the Bird's Head Peninsula, also known as the Vogelkop Peninsula.

References 

Populated places in Southwest Papua
Populated places in Tambrauw

Southwest Papua